Tibet: A History is a nonfiction book by Sam Van Schaik.

Background 
The book provides an encyclopedic view on Tibetan history from the seventh century to the present, i.e., 2011.

Reception 
Writing for the Economic and Political Weekly, Abanti Bhattacharya of the University of Delhi writes, "[The Book] stands out from the rest of the genre on Tibet’s history not simply because it makes an attempt to look at the status of Tibet as many other studies do, but because it essentially narrates the story of Tibet as it is."

In a review for The Journal of Asian Studies, Brenton Sullivan writes, "[The author] deftly addresses the early centuries of Tibetan history. While the traditional narrative provides his chronological and topological framework, he adds details unknown to many normative histories and challenges simplistic presentations of the traditional narrative."

Writing for the Bulletin of the School of Oriental & African Studies, Nathan Hill suggests that the book, "covers its subject at a level of detail appropriate for an undergraduate survey course, incorporating the latest research and the author’s owninsights at every step. The lack of information on the decline of the Pagmodru or on the nineteenth century in Central Tibet is disappointing, but warranted by the pau-city of research in these areas."

References 

Books about Tibet
2011 non-fiction books
Yale University Press books